Takin' It to the Streets is the sixth studio album by American rock band The Doobie Brothers. The album was released on March 19, 1976, by Warner Bros. Records. It was the first to feature Michael McDonald on lead vocals.

Background
By late 1974, touring was beginning to take its toll on the band, especially leader Tom Johnston. Things became worse during touring in support of Stampede when he was diagnosed with stomach ulcers. His condition worsened and several shows were cancelled. With Johnston forced to reduce his involvement with the band, the other members considered just calling it quits, but while in Baton Rouge, Louisiana, member Jeff Baxter suggested calling up friend and fellow Steely Dan graduate Michael McDonald, who at the time was between gigs and living in a garage apartment. McDonald was reluctant at first, feeling he was not what they wanted; according to him, "...they were looking for someone who could play Hammond B-3 organ and a lot of keyboards, and I was just a songwriter/piano hacker. But more than anything, I think they were looking for a singer to fill Tommy's shoes." He agreed to join them and met them at the Le Pavillon Hotel in New Orleans, where they moved into a warehouse to rehearse for the next two days. Expecting to be finished once touring was completed, McDonald was surprised when the band invited him to the studio to work on their next album.

Recording
With Johnston on the sidelines, the band was unsure how to proceed. They doubted being able to make an album without Johnston.  "I knew the record company was panicked about any change in the band," McDonald admitted. "They were leery about getting a new guy. I was thrilled to have had the gig, but I wasn't expecting all that much." With encouragement from producer Ted Templeman, the band began poring over the songs they had available. They knew they needed more, so McDonald brought in his own demos. Templeman told them, according to Patrick Simmons, "You've got a real diamond in the rough here that you can make into something if you want to go ahead." They decided to record his songs knowing it would take them in a completely different direction. While Johnston was absent for most of the sessions, he contributed one song – "Turn It Loose" – as well as back-up vocals and duet vocals with Simmons on "Wheels of Fortune". "I hadn't quit the band", he later stated. "I just wasn't physically able to do it. I needed to get off the road and get away from that whole scene for a while."

Track listing

Personnel
The Doobie Brothers
Tom Johnston – electric guitar, lead and backing vocals on "Turn It Loose"; vocals on "Wheels of Fortune"
Patrick Simmons – electric guitars, lead and backing vocals
Jeff "Skunk" Baxter – electric guitars, acoustic guitar on "For Someone Special"
Michael McDonald – piano, electric piano, clavinet, synthesizers, lead and backing vocals
Tiran Porter – bass, backing vocals, lead vocal on "For Someone Special"
John Hartman – drums, percussion
Keith Knudsen – drums, percussion, backing vocals

Additional personnel
The Memphis Horns
Wayne Jackson – trumpet
Andrew Love – tenor saxophone
James Mitchell – baritone saxophone
Lewis Collins – tenor saxophone
Jack Hale – trombone
Bobby LaKind – congas on "Takin' It to the Streets", "Losin' End" and "Rio"
Richie Hayward – drums (with John Hartman) on "Wheels of Fortune"
Novi Novog – viola on "Losin' End"
Jesse Butler – organ on "Takin' It to the Streets"
Maria Muldaur – cameo vocal on "Rio"
Ted Templeman – additional percussion

Production
Producer – Ted Templeman
Production Coordination – Beth Naranjo
Engineer – Donn Landee
Art Direction – Ed Thrasher
Photography – Dan Fong
Management – Bruce Cohn

Charts

References

1976 albums
The Doobie Brothers albums
Albums produced by Ted Templeman
Warner Records albums
Albums recorded at Sunset Sound Recorders